David Francis Griffin (13 May 1905 – 18 February 1944) was a Canadian middle-distance runner. He competed in the men's 1500 metres at the 1928 Summer Olympics.

He died serving as a Flying Officer in the Royal Canadian Air Force in World War II, when passenger of a ferry plane from Iceland to Newfoundland which crashed. His grave is located in the Goose Bay Joint Military Cemetery in Labrador.

References

External links
 

1905 births
1944 deaths
Athletes (track and field) at the 1928 Summer Olympics
Canadian male middle-distance runners
Olympic track and field athletes of Canada
Athletes from Hamilton, Ontario
Canadian military personnel killed in World War II
Royal Canadian Air Force personnel of World War II
Royal Canadian Air Force officers
Canadian military personnel from Ontario
Burials in Newfoundland and Labrador
20th-century Canadian people